Boland Pey (also known as Khātūnābād, Khātūnābād-e Boland Pey, Boland Pāyeh, and Būland Pāya) is a village in Sarjam Rural District, Ahmadabad District, Mashhad County, Razavi Khorasan Province, Iran. At the 2006 census, its population was 206, in 53 families.

Notes 

Populated places in Mashhad County